Roland Piétri (1910 in Paris – 27 October 1986 in the same city), was a French actor and theatre director.

Biography
Roland Piétri was co-director of the Comédie des Champs-Élysées from 1944 to 1948 with Claude Sainval and for one season (1946–1947), directed the Centre dramatique de l'Est based in Colmar. There he established a troupe with the comedians Françoise Christophe, André Reybaz, Catherine Toth. He then returned to the Comédie des Champs-Élysées and became theatre director of Jean Anouilh's plays.

Theatre

Comedian
 1937 : Julius Caesar by William Shakespeare, mise en scène Charles Dullin, Théâtre de l'Atelier
 1942 : Faux Jour by Herman Closson, mise en scène Paulette Pax, Théâtre de l'Œuvre 
 1947 : Le Misanthrope by Molière, mise en scène Roland Piétri, Centre dramatique de l'Est Colmar
 1951 : Siegfried de Jean Giraudoux, mise en scène Claude Sainval, Comédie des Champs-Élysées 
 1953 : L'Alouette by Jean Anouilh, mise en scène Roland Piétri et Jean Anouilh, Théâtre Montparnasse 
 1956 : Pauvre Bitos ou le Dîner de têtes by Jean Anouilh, mise en scène Roland Piétri and Jean Anouilh, Théâtre Montparnasse 
 1957 : Pauvre Bitos ou le Dîner de têtes by Jean Anouilh, mise en scène Roland Piétri and Jean Anouilh, Comédie des Champs-Élysées
 1958 : Ardèle ou la Marguerite by Jean Anouilh, mise en scène Roland Piétri and Jean Anouilh, Comédie des Champs-Élysées 
 1959 : L'Hurluberlu by Jean Anouilh, mise en scène Roland Piétri, Comédie des Champs-Élysées
 1960 : Le Tartuffe by Molière, mise en scène Roland Piétri and Jean Anouilh, Comédie des Champs-Élysées 
 1960 : Le Songe du critique by Jean Anouilh, mise en scène by the author, Comédie des Champs-Élysées
 1966 : Becket ou l'Honneur de Dieu by Jean Anouilh, mise en scène Roland Piétri and Jean Anouilh, Théâtre Montparnasse 
 1967 : Pauvre Bitos ou le Dîner de têtes by Jean Anouilh, mise en scène Roland Piétri and Jean Anouilh, Théâtre de Paris
 1969 : Dear Antoine: or, the Love That Failed by Jean Anouilh, mise en scène Roland Piétri and Jean Anouilh, Comédie des Champs-Élysées
 1969 : Un ami imprévu de Robert Thomas after Agatha Christie, mise en scène Roland Piétri, Comédie des Champs-Élysées 
 1973 : The Waltz of the Toreadors by Jean Anouilh, mise en scène Roland Piétri and Jean Anouilh, Comédie des Champs-Élysées 
 1974 : Colombe by Jean Anouilh, mise en scène Roland Piétri and Jean Anouilh, Comédie des Champs-Élysées

Theatre director

 Le Chandelier and Un caprice by Alfred de Musset, Comédie des Champs-Élysées 
 1942 : Snouck by Philippe Frey, mise en scène with Claude Sainval, Comédie des Champs-Élysées 
 1944 : La Nuit de la Saint-Jean by J. M. Barrie, Comédie des Champs-Élysées 
 1945 : La Sauvage by Jean Anouilh, mise en scène with Claude Sainval, Comédie des Champs-Élysées 
 1945 : Candida de George Bernard Shaw, Comédie des Champs-Élysées
 1946 : And Then There Were None by Agatha Christie, Comédie des Champs-Élysées  
 1947 : Le Survivant by Jean-François Noël, Centre dramatique de l'Est Colmar 
 1947 : Les Folies amoureuses by Jean-François Regnard, Centre dramatique de l'Est Colmar
 1947 : Le Misanthrope by Molière, Centre dramatique de l'Est Colmar
 1948 : Ardèle ou la Marguerite by Jean Anouilh, Comédie des Champs-Élysées 
 1950 : Va faire un tour au bois by Roger Dornès, Théâtre Gramont
 1950 : La mariée est trop belle by Michel Duran, Théâtre Saint-Georges
 1951 : Les Innocents by William Archibald, Théâtre Édouard VII
 1952 : La Grande Roue de , Théâtre Saint-Georges
 1952 : The Waltz of the Toreadors by Jean Anouilh, Comédie des Champs-Élysées 
 1952 : La Grande Oreille by Guillaume Hanoteau, Théâtre Saint-Georges
 1953 : L'Alouette by Jean Anouilh, mise en scène with the author, Théâtre Montparnasse 
 1954 : Cécile ou l'École des pères by Jean Anouilh, Comédie des Champs-Élysées 
 1955 : Ornifle ou le Courant d'air by Jean Anouilh, mise en scène with the author, Comédie des Champs-Élysées  
 1956 : Pauvre Bitos ou le Dîner de têtes by Jean Anouilh, mise en scène with the author, Théâtre Montparnasse 
 1957 : Pauvre Bitos ou le Dîner de têtes by Jean Anouilh, directed by the author, Comédie des Champs-Élysées 
 1958 : Candida de George Bernard Shaw, Théâtre Daunou 
 1958 : Ardèle ou la Marguerite by Jean Anouilh, mise en scène with the author, Comédie des Champs-Élysées 
 1959 : L'Hurluberlu by Jean Anouilh, Comédie des Champs-Élysées 
 1959 : Becket ou l'Honneur de Dieu by Jean Anouilh, mise en scène with the author, Théâtre Montparnasse
 1960 : Le Tartuffe by Molière, Comédie des Champs-Élysées 
 1961 : La Grotte by Jean Anouilh, mise en scène with th author, Théâtre Montparnasse 
 1962 : L'Orchestre by Jean Anouilh, mise en scène with the author, Comédie des Champs-Élysées 
 1962 : La Foire d'empoigne by Jean Anouilh, mise en scène with the author, Comédie des Champs-Élysées 
 1962 : Victor ou les Enfants au pouvoir by Roger Vitrac, mise en scène with Jean Anouilh, Théâtre de l'Ambigu
 1963 : Victor ou les Enfants au pouvoir by Roger Vitrac, mise en scène with Jean Anouilh, Théâtre de l'Athénée
 1963 : L'Acheteuse by Steve Passeur, mise en scène with Jean Anouilh, Comédie des Champs-Élysées   
 1964 : Richard III by Shakespeare, mise en scène with Jean Anouilh, Théâtre Montparnasse 
 1965 : L'Acheteuse by Steve Passeur, mise en scène with Jean Anouilh, Comédie des Champs-Élysées 
 1966 : Das Käthchen von Heilbronn by Heinrich von Kleist, mise en scène xith Jean Anouilh, Théâtre Montparnasse 
 1966 : Becket ou l'Honneur de Dieu by Jean Anouilh, mise en scène with the author, Théâtre Montparnasse 
 1967 : Pauvre Bitos ou le Dîner de têtes by Jean Anouilh, mise en scène with the author, Théâtre de Paris
 1968 : L'Alouette by Jean Anouilh, mise en scène with the author, Théâtre de Paris
 1968 : Le Boulanger, la Boulangère et le Petit Mitron by Jean Anouilh, mise en scène with the author, Comédie des Champs-Élysées
 1969 : Un ami imprévu by Robert Thomas after Agatha Christie, Comédie des Champs-Élysées 
 1969 : L'Ascenseur électrique by Julien Vartet, Théâtre de la Renaissance
 1969 : Dear Antoine: or, the Love That Failed by Jean Anouilh, mise en scène with the author, Comédie des Champs-Élysées
 1970 : Ne réveillez pas Madame by Jean Anouilh, mise en scène with the author, Comédie des Champs-Élysées 
 1970 : Les Poissons rouges by Jean Anouilh, mise en scène with the author, Théâtre de l'Œuvre
 1971 : Becket ou l'Honneur de Dieu by Jean Anouilh, Comédie-Française
 1972 : Tu étais si gentil quand tu étais petit by Jean Anouilh, mise en scène with the author, Théâtre Antoine
 1972 : Le Directeur de l'Opéra by Jean Anouilh, mise en scène with the author, Comédie des Champs-Élysées 
 1973 : The Waltz of the Toreadors by Jean Anouilh, mise en scène with the author, Comédie des Champs-Élysées 
 1974 : Colombe by Jean Anouilh, mise en scène with the author, Comédie des Champs-Élysées 
 1975 : L'Arrestation by Jean Anouilh, mise en scène with the author, Théâtre de l'Athénée
 1976 : Chers zoiseaux by Jean Anouilh, mise en scène with the author, Comédie des Champs-Élysées 
 1976 : Le Scénario by Jean Anouilh, mise en scène with the author, Théâtre de l'Œuvre 
 1978 : La Culotte by Jean Anouilh, mise en scène with th author, Théâtre de l'Atelier
 1979 : Ardèle ou la Marguerite by Jean Anouilh, mise en scène with Pierre Mondy, Théâtre Hébertot
 1981 : Le Nombril by Jean Anouilh, mise en scène with the author, Théâtre de l'Atelier

Filmography
Cinrma
 1938 : Entrée des artistes by Marc Allégret
 1956 : Les Aventures de Till L'Espiègle by Gérard Philipe

Television
 1969 :  : Un ami imprévu by Robert Thomas after Agatha Christie, mise en scène Roland Piétri, TV director Pierre Sabbagh, Théâtre Marigny

External links
 

French male stage actors
Theatre directors from Paris
Male actors from Paris
1910 births
1986 deaths